Vilibald Vuco (born 15 July 1996) is a Croatian professional footballer who most recently played for Croatian club NK Hrvatski Dragovoljac as a midfielder.

He is the son of Croatian rock and folk musician Siniša Vuco, and the brother of Croatian trap musician Brigita Vuco.

Club career
Born in Split, Vuco joined NK Hrvatski Dragovoljac's youth setup in 2011, from HNK Hajduk Split. After a short-term loan deal at NK Stupnik in 2015, he made his debut for the club before moving to NK Rudeš in January 2016.

Vuco contributed with three goals in 26 matches during the 2016–17 campaign, as his side achieved promotion to 1. HNL. He made his debut in the category on 16 July 2017, starting in a 1–1 away draw against NK Osijek.

On 1 February 2018, Vuco moved to Rudeš' affiliate club Deportivo Alavés, signing an 18-month deal and being assigned to the reserves in Tercera División.

References

External links
Sport Manager profile 

1996 births
Living people
Footballers from Split, Croatia
Association football midfielders
Croatian footballers
NK Hrvatski Dragovoljac players
NK Rudeš players
Deportivo Alavés B players
Croatian Football League players
First Football League (Croatia) players
Second Football League (Croatia) players
Segunda División B players
Tercera División players
Slovenian Second League players
Croatian expatriate footballers
Expatriate footballers in Spain
Croatian expatriate sportspeople in Spain
Expatriate footballers in Slovenia
Croatian expatriate sportspeople in Slovenia